Judge Marsh may refer to:

John Otho Marsh Jr. (1926–2019), town judge of Strasburg, Virginia
Joseph Marsh (1726–1811), judge of the Confiscation Court for eastern Vermont
Juanita Marsh (1926–2013), judge of the College Park, Georgia, municipal court
Malcolm F. Marsh (born 1928), judge of the United States District Court for the District of Oregon
Rabe Ferguson Marsh Jr. (1905–1993), judge of the United States District Court for the Western District of Pennsylvania
Robert McC. Marsh (1878–1958), judge of the New York Supreme Court
Spencer M. Marsh (1864–1932), judge of the San Diego County Superior Court